Proletarka is a rural locality (a selo) in Proletarsky Selsoviet, Altaysky District, Altai Krai, Russia. The population was 165 as of 2013. There are 2 streets.

Geography 
Proletarka is located 20 km south of Altayskoye (the district's administrative centre) by road. Rudnik is the nearest rural locality.

References 

Rural localities in Altaysky District, Altai Krai